The 1940 Soviet Chess Championship was the 12th edition of USSR Chess Championship. Held from 5 September to 3 October 1940 in Moscow. The tournament was won by Andor Lilienthal and Igor Bondarevsky. Twenty of the Soviet Union's strongest masters competed in the final, six of whom qualified in the semifinals in Kiev earlier that year: Eduard Gerstenfeld, Mark Stolberg, Igor Bondarevsky, Iosif Rudakovsky, Alexander Konstantinopolsky and Peter Dubinin. The remaining invitations went to the Soviet chess elite. Botvinnik did his worst championship, only drawing in 5th/6th position, losing matches to both winners. This championship marked the debut of the future world champion Vassily Smyslov (3rd) and Paul Keres (4th). USSR had expanded its territory in 1939-40, incorporating the Baltic states, which meant that the strong masters Paul Keres from Estonia and Vladimir Petrov from Latvia were able to participate. In 1941, the top six played a competition called Absolute Championship of Soviet Union, ending with Botvinnik's victory.

Tables and results

Semifinal

Final

1941 Absolute Champion of the USSR 
The winner of the 1940 Soviet championship should face world champion Alexander Alekhine for world title. Nor did the result settle the question of which Soviet player
should challenge Alekhine. A new sports official worked diligently behind the scenes to undermine the original decision to have a match for the title between Bondarevsky
and Lilienthal. As a result, it was announced a new title Absolute Champion of the USSR was being set up and would be contested in Leningrad and Moscow as a
match-tournament of the top six. In fact, the Absolute Championship was to be a one-off, never to be played again. Only two months after Botvinnik's success, his dreams of
challenging Alekhine were shattered when Hitler invaded the Soviet Union.

References 

USSR Chess Championships
Championship
Chess
1940 in chess
Chess